Gideons International is an Evangelical Christian association for men founded in 1899 in Janesville, Wisconsin. The Gideons' primary activity, along with their wives in the Auxiliary, is "encouraging each other to do the work of the Lord, focusing on who they are before God, and strengthening the power of their personal testimony for the Lord Jesus Christ". They are most recognized for distributing copies of Scripture free of charge, paid for by freewill offerings from local churches and from members themselves. This Bible distribution is a worldwide enterprise taking place in around 200 countries, territories and possessions. The association's members focus on distributing complete Bibles, New Testaments, or portions thereof. These copies are printed in over 108 languages. The association is most widely known for its Bibles placed in lodging rooms. The Gideons also distribute to hospitals and other medical offices, schools (usually in first year) and colleges, military bases, as well as jails and prisons. The association was named after the Biblical figure Gideon depicted in Judges 6.

In 1908, the Gideons began distributing free Bibles. The first Bibles were placed in rooms of the Superior Hotel in Superior, Montana. Members of The Gideons International currently average distribution of over 70 million Bibles annually. On average, more than two copies of the Bible are distributed per second through Gideons International. As of April 2015, Gideons International has distributed over two billion Bibles. 

The headquarters of Gideons International is in Nashville, Tennessee.

History

The organization began in the Fall of 1898, when two traveling salesmen, John H. Nicholson of Janesville, Wisconsin, and Samuel E. Hill of Beloit, Wisconsin, met in a hotel room they shared at the Central House Hotel in Boscobel, Wisconsin, and discussed the formation of an association. In May 1899, the two met again in Beaver Dam, Wisconsin, where they decided the goal of their association would be to unite traveling salesmen for evangelism. In July 1899, Nicholson, Hill, and Will J. Knights met at the YMCA in Janesville. Two of them continued with the distribution of the Bibles. Gideons began distributing free Bibles, the work they are most known for, in 1908, when the first Bibles were placed in the rooms of the Superior Hotel in Superior, Montana.

The organization describes its connection to the story of Gideon:

Gideon was a man who was willing to do exactly what God wanted him to do, regardless of his own judgment as to the plans or results. Humility, faith, and obedience were his great elements of character. This is the standard that The Gideons International is trying to establish in all its members, each man to be ready to do God's will at any time, at any place, and in any way that the Holy Spirit leads.

In keeping with this symbolism, the symbol of the Gideons is a two-handled pitcher and torch recalling Gideon's victory over the Midianites as described in Judges, Chapter 7.

Membership

As of 2022, The Gideons reported having 269,500 members in 200 countries and territories.

Membership in The Gideons International generally consists of current or retired business or professional men (except clergy) aged 21 or older who are members in good standing of an evangelical or Protestant church, and adhere to the core spiritual beliefs of the organization. Wives of Gideons may similarly join the Auxiliary of The Gideons International.

Programs

In addition to their well-known hotel room Bibles, members of The Gideons International also distribute Bibles to members of the military of various countries, to hospitals, nursing homes, prisons, MPs and students.

Testaments distributed

A typical Bible or New Testament from The Gideons International contains:
 a short preface;
 a pamphlet suggesting Bible verses that may be of assistance in various sorts of trouble;
 translations of John 3:16 into a variety of languages and scripts;
 the Bible text itself, without notes, references, or any other reference matter other than chapter and verse headings; this can either be the full Bible (typical of the copies placed in hotel rooms), or just the New Testament, Psalms, and Proverbs (typical of the copies handed out as gifts to individuals);
 a short description of the evangelical understanding of salvation, with biblical quotations, and a place for the reader to sign and date their confession of Jesus as their savior (this is especially common in the shorter editions featuring the New Testament, Psalms, and Proverbs).

Colors of Testaments distributed

The covers of the New Testaments distributed by Gideons are color-coded based on which groups they are meant for:
 Orange: given in sidewalk distribution
 Green: for college/university students
 Red: for in-school distribution to Middle/High school students
 Digital Camouflage/Desert Camouflage: for the military
 Dark blue: printed in a language other than English Some also went to county jails 
 White: for medical professionals
 Light blue: for distribution by the Auxiliary only
 Brown: for jail and prison facilities
 Burgundy: personal worker's testaments (for individual witnessing by Gideons)
 Periwinkle: personal worker's testaments (for individual witnessing by the Auxiliary)

During World War II there were Military Issued New Testaments, brown for Army and blue for Navy distributed by the Gideons. In addition to the Desert Camouflage and the Digital Camouflage, there are also Woodland Camouflage editions for the Military.

Distribution of Bibles on public school grounds

The distribution of Bibles on public school grounds has been an issue because of the U.S. Supreme Court's interpretation of the Establishment Clause in the Constitution. Five Supreme Court cases discuss this issue: Everson, McCollum, Zorach, Engel, and Schempp.

In 2008, Americans United for Separation of Church and State brought suit against the South Iron R-1 School District in Missouri for allowing the Gideons to distribute Bibles during class time. In 2009, the 8th U.S. Circuit Court of Appeals in St. Louis upheld a lower court ruling that found the South Iron district's distribution of Bibles to the schoolchildren in their classrooms was unconstitutional. An "attorney representing the South Iron School District in Annapolis, Mo., said the decision allows a new policy to finally be implemented, one that allows any group to hand out literature at the rural district, including information on how children can obtain Bibles."

The Gideons International continues to contact youth in America through The Life Book, coordinating with churches and their youth to distribute copies of the Bible in high schools. The Alliance Defending Freedom, as of 2013, maintains that there are "constitutionally permissible ways in which Gideons Bibles may be distributed," and attorneys Rory Gray and Jeremy Tedesco write that the Alliance Defending Freedom sent letters to 174 school districts in Kentucky stating: "Federal caselaw overwhelmingly supports the decision to grant religious and non-religious community groups an equal opportunity to provide literature to willing students." In early 2014, the "Gideons International again distributed Bibles at a public elementary school in Kentucky."

Cultural references

The Beatles mentioned the Gideon Bible in their 1968 song "Rocky Raccoon".

The band Jethro Tull mentioned a Gideons Bible open at page 1 in their 1971 song "Locomotive Breath".

The band Clutch references the Gideons in their 2004 song "Profits of Doom" on their album "Blast Tyrant"

The musician John Cale has a song called Gideon's Bible in his 1970 debut solo album "Vintage Violence".

See also

 Pocket Testament League

References

External links

 The Gideons International official site
 

Bible societies
Christian organizations established in the 19th century
Evangelical organizations established in the 19th century
History of Wisconsin
Religious organizations established in 1899
Non-profit organizations based in Tennessee
International non-profit organizations
Evangelical Christian missions
1899 establishments in Wisconsin
Christian organizations based in the United States